The 1923–24 Sussex County Football League season was the fourth in the history of the competition and was won by Royal Corps of Signals.

League table
The league featured 12 clubs, 11 which competed in the last season, along with one new club:
 Allen West

League table

References

1921-22
9